Lyudmila Golomazova (born 13 November 1947) is a Soviet sprinter. She competed in the women's 100 metres at the 1968 Summer Olympics.

References

External links
 

1947 births
Living people
Athletes (track and field) at the 1968 Summer Olympics
Soviet female sprinters
Olympic athletes of the Soviet Union
Place of birth missing (living people)
Olympic female sprinters
Universiade medalists in athletics (track and field)
Universiade gold medalists for the Soviet Union